The 2010–11 North Dakota Fighting Sioux men's basketball team represented the University of North Dakota in the 2010–11 NCAA Division I men's basketball season. The Fighting Sioux, led by head coach Brian Jones, played their home games at the Betty Engelstad Sioux Center in Grand Forks, North Dakota, as members of the Great West Conference. This was the last season that North Dakota was known as the Fighting Sioux; following years of controversy, the university announced plans stop using the nickname by April 2011. The team went without a nickname for the next four seasons, later adopting the nickname Fighting Hawks in 2015.

As a recently formed conference, the Great West Conference was not eligible for an automatic bid to the NCAA Division I men's basketball tournament. Instead, as the Great West champion, North Dakota was given an automatic bid to the 2011 CIT. The Fighting Sioux were eliminated in the first round of the tournament by Air Force, 77–67.

Roster 

Source

Schedule and results

|-
!colspan=9 style=|Regular season

|-
!colspan=9 style=| Great West tournament

|-
!colspan=9 style=| CollegeInsider.com tournament

Source

References

North Dakota Fighting Hawks men's basketball seasons
North Dakota
North Dakota
North Dakota men's basketball
North Dakota men's basketball